Heropanti is an 2014 Indian Hindi-language  romantic action film directed by Sabbir Khan and produced by Sajid Nadiadwala. The film stars Tiger Shroff and Kriti Sanon in their Hindi film debuts alongside Prakash Raj in a supporting role. A remake of the Telugu film Parugu, it was released on 23 May 2014. A sequel titled Heropanti 2 was released in 2022.

Plot
Suraj Singh Chaudhary is a very strict patriarch of the Jat family from Haryana and is a well-respected leader in his village and brothers. When Renu, Chaudhary's elder daughter, elopes with her boyfriend, Rakesh, on the night of her marriage, Chaudhary decides to find them at any cost. His brothers and henchmen round up Rakesh's friends, including one Bablu, and hold them captive till they tell of the couple's whereabouts. They say to him that they do not know anything, but no one believes them. Meanwhile, Bablu tells his friends that he is in love with a girl of that town, whom he does not know, and he only has her dropped earring as a clue. The friends manage to escape one day, but Bablu gets a glimpse of the girl and stops in his tracks, and the boys are caught because of him.

Meanwhile, Chaudhary's younger daughter and Renu's sister, Dimpy, find Renu's love letters and tries to get rid of them, but the letters unintentionally end up in the hands of Bablu and his friends. Bablu uses them as leverage and gets Dimpy to help him find the girl he loves in exchange for Renu's location. That night, Bablu escapes and enters the house during a blackout, then ends up drunk. Dimpy finds Bablu, and he gives her the earring he discovered that belongs to the girl he fell in love with. She realizes that the girl Bablu saw was none other than Dimpy, but she stays silent.

When Chaudhary's men almost succeed in locating Renu and Rakesh, Bablu helps them escape and board a bus without detection. When his friends confront him about his deceit, Bablu defends himself, which Dimpy overhears. She inadvertently reveals this to her uncle, who demands that she identify who helped Rakesh and Renu elope. They figure out that it was Bablu and he realises that the girl he loves is none other than Dimpy. He tells Chaudhary that Rakesh-Renu are in Delhi when they threaten to kill his friends.

Bablu and his friends and Dimpy accompany Chaudhary and his men to Delhi to find the couple. At this juncture, Dimpy is kidnapped by some local goons, who attempt to rape her. Bablu manages to locate her in time and beats up the goons, winning Chaudhary's trust. In the morning, while Dimpy confesses her love to Bablu, Chaudhary spots Renu and Rakesh and chases after them, with Bablu and Chaudhary's men following close behind. They manage to catch up to them, but when Renu talks back to her father, Chaudhary is heartbroken. When Renu and Rakesh are about to be killed as punishment, Renu confesses that she is pregnant. Chaudhary decides to spare their lives, but at a cost – openly claiming that Renu is no more to him.

The group returns home, and Chaudhary arranges Dimpy's marriage with Rajjo. Bablu realizes that he misses Dimpy too much. He and his friends return for the wedding to get Dimpy to elope with Bablu. However, Chaudhary is frightened when Bablu returns after finding out about Dimpy and Bablu's love. He keeps a close eye on Bablu and Dimpy. When Chaudhary confronts Bablu, Bablu tells him that he understands how Chaudhary felt when Renu ran away from home and promised him that he would not elope with Dimpy.

When Bablu and his friends are about to leave, Rajjo arrives & beats up Bablu, but Bablu fights back and defeats him when Rajjo insults Bablu and Dimpy. They are, however, stopped at the last moment by Chaudhary. He realizes that Dimpy will only be happy if she is with Bablu and lets Bablu and Dimpy reunite. Chaudhary and the other Jat community people agree to permit inter-caste and love marriages, and Chaudhary accepts Renu back as his daughter.

Cast
 Tiger Shroff as Bablu
 Kriti Sanon as Dimpy Chaudhary
 Prakash Raj as Suraj Singh Chaudhary, Dimpy's and Renu's father
Raashul Tandon as Kiki
 Sandeepa Dhar as Renuka "Renu" Chaudhary, Dimpy's sister
 Ranjha Vikram Singh as Rajjo Fauji
 Shireesh Sharma as Police Commissioner
 Priyamvada Kant in a special appearance
 Samar Jai Singh as Bhuppi
 K. C. Shankar as Pappi
 Sunil Grover as Driver Devpal
 Jatin Suri as Jitesh, Bablu's friend
 Sugandha Mishra as Shalu, Dimpy's friend
Prashant Singh as Sukhi
Dev Sharma as Rakesh

Production

Salman Khan asked Sajid Nadiadwala to launch Jackie Shroff's son Tiger Shroff for the film who was signed in June 2012. Filming was mostly done in Kashmir including the romantic song "Rabba". Official trailer was released on 6 April 2014. The film was released on 25 May 2014.

Reception
The film received mixed reviews, who appreciated performances of ensemble cast, action sequences performed by Shroff, and cinematography, but criticized for screenplay, pace, and narration.

Film critic Subhash K. Jha gave it 3.5 out of 5 stars and said that Shroff delivers a rare combination of romantic and action oriented protagonist. Bollywood Hungama critic Taran Adarsh also gave the movie 3.5 out of 5 stars, calling it an entertainer that hits the right notes. News18 critic Rajeev Masand gave the film 2 out of 5 stars and stated that "for Heropanti, with its regressive themes, sexist humor, and stock villains wears you out early on during its 2 hours 26-minute running time." Anupama Chopra also gave the movie 2 out of 5 stars and overall criticised the movie by saying, "the disjointed narrative brims with low-IQ high-testosterone men brandishing weapons. The women are puppets who either simper or scream." According to Firstpost critic Mihir Fadnavis, Tiger Shroff can pull off stunts, but that is about it. Faheem Rumani of India Today gave it 1.5 out of 5 stars, stating that, "Heropanti is all about Shroff's athletic ability and has little to do with his acting skills".
Puneet kapil Gave this movie 2/5* and added that the movie is for only one time watch and that too for light comedy and action scenes.

Awards

Music

Soundtrack
The soundtrack was composed by Sajid–Wajid, Manj Musik and Mustafa Zahid. The lyrics were written by Kausar Munir, Raftaar and Mustafa Zahid. Mohit Chauhan, Wajid, Manj Musik, Nindy Kaur, Raftaar, Mustafa Zahid, Shreya Ghoshal and Arijit Singh lent their voices for the soundtrack.  The soundtrack was released on 21 April 2014.

The song Whistle Baja had its signature tune similar to the hit song Lambi Judai originally sung by Reshma for Tiger Shroff's father Jackie Shroff's film Hero.

Soundtrack reception
Joginder Tuteja from Rediff gave 3.5 stars and stated, "With four good songs in a row, Heropanti's music is pretty much a paisa vasool experience already. So, though you may be taken aback by the title of Manju Musik Raftaar's next offering 'The Pappi Song', you would like to hear it." Koimoi's Aishwarya gave 3 stars and said, "A sweet stereotypically Bollywood album with nothing much to say about. Love it for the good old pyaar – vyaar and dance – shance or hate it for being yet another pile of numbers tracing the lines of tested compositions."

Box office
The film grossed approximately  worldwide. At the end of three weeks, Heropanti had collected  nett.

Sequel
The sequel, Heropanti 2 was confirmed by Tiger Shroff on 19 February 2020, and the official announcement happened on 28 February with the unveiling of two first look posters presenting its release date as 16 July 2021. In October 2020, makers announced that Tara Sutaria will enact the heroine opposite Shroff and that filming will begin in December 2020. However the filming ended up getting pushed ahead due to COVID-19 pandemic which led to the postponement of release date too. On 2 March 2020, the sequel's third poster, along with a new release date of 3 December 2021, was revealed. Filming of the first schedule finally kicked off in Mumbai in April 2021.

References

External links 
 
 

2010s Hindi-language films
2014 films
2014 romantic drama films
Hindi remakes of Telugu films
Films scored by Sajid–Wajid
Films scored by Manj Musik
Films scored by Mustafa Zahid
UTV Motion Pictures films
Indian romantic drama films
Indian action drama films
2014 action drama films
Indian romantic action films
Films directed by Sabbir Khan
2010s romantic action films